The German Christian Liebig Foundation builds schools in Africa and supports educational programs. It is named after Christian Liebig, a journalist of the German newspaper Focus, who died in a missile attack outside Baghdad in 2003.

About the foundation
Christian Liebig died on 7 April 2003 in a missile attack outside Baghdad. The Focus-reporter was one of the 600 embedded journalists reporting on the war from within the ranks of the US army. He was the only German journalist to lose his life working in Iraq. His parents, partner, friends and colleagues all wanted to do something to make some sense of his death and generate a spark of hope, so they founded the Christian Liebig Foundation on 21 August 2003.

Objectives
In the southeastern African nations of Malawi and Mozambique, the Christian Liebig Foundation builds homes for children in need. It also builds, manages and supports schools, in collaboration with other associations, foundations and initiatives.

Projects
Since its foundation in 2003, the Christian Liebig Foundation has operated in Malawi, building primary and secondary schools, and supporting educational projects. At the Christian Liebig Secondary School, about 240 children are taught every year. Nineteen primary schools have been built or rebuilt. In Mozambique since 2007, the Christian Liebig Foundation has supported three villages, the so-called Millennium Village Mabote.

External links
 Christian Liebig Foundation

Charities based in Germany
Foreign charities operating in Malawi
Foreign charities operating in Mozambique
Non-profit organisations based in Bavaria